Nezdice na Šumavě is a municipality and village in Klatovy District in the Plzeň Region of the Czech Republic. It has about 300 inhabitants.

Administrative parts
Villages and hamlets of Ostružno, Pohorsko and Ždánov are administrative parts of Nezdice na Šumavě.

History
The first written mention of Nezdice na Šumavě is from 1396.

References

Villages in Klatovy District